The New South Wales Women cricket team, also known as the New South Wales Breakers, is the women's representative cricket team for the Australian State of New South Wales. They play most of their home games at North Sydney Oval and they also use Hurstville Oval, Sydney and Blacktown ISP Oval, Sydney. They compete in the Women's National Cricket League (WNCL), the premier 50-over women's cricket tournament in Australia, and are by far its most successful team, having won 20 titles. They previously played in the now-defunct Australian Women's Twenty20 Cup and Australian Women's Cricket Championships.

History

1891–1930: Early history
New South Wales's first recorded match was against Victoria on 17 March 1891, however, the result is unknown. Their first match with a known result was also against Victoria, with New South Wales winning a one-day, two innings match by 53 runs on 21 April 1930.

1931–1996: Australian Women's Cricket Championships
New South Wales played alongside Queensland and Victoria in the inaugural season of the Australian Women's Cricket Championships in 1930–31. They continued to play in the Championships until its final season in 1995–96. They won the title 13 times, making them the second most successful team after Victoria.

1996–present: Women's National Cricket League and Twenty20 Cup
New South Wales joined the newly-established WNCL in 1996–97. They are by far its most successful team, having won 20 titles, their most recent being the 2018–19 competition. New South Wales also won two Twenty20 Cups in 2012–13 and 2014–15.

Grounds
New South Wales have used a number of grounds over the years. Their first recorded match against Victoria in 1891 was played at the Sydney Cricket Ground, which they have continued to use intermittently. Historically they have played the vast majority of their home matches at various grounds in Sydney as well as intermittent matches in Newcastle.

Since 2012, New South Wales have played most of their home matches at Blacktown ISP Oval as well as occasional matches at North Sydney Oval and Hurstville Oval. They played their two 2020–21 WNCL home games at North Sydney Oval. In the 2021–22 WNCL, they played three matches at North Sydney Oval and two at Hurstville Oval. In the 2022–23 WNCL, they continued to use North Sydney Oval, as well as playing their first ever WNCL matches at Wade Park, Orange.

Players

Current squad
Based on squad announced for the 2022/23 season. Players in bold have international caps.

Notable players
Players who have played for New South Wales and played internationally are listed below, in order of first international appearance (given in brackets):

 Margaret Peden (1934)
 Hazel Pritchard (1934)
 Ruby Monaghan (1934)
 Essie Shevill (1934)
 Fernie Blade (1934)
 Barbara Peden (1935)
 Rene Shevill (1935)
 Amy Hudson (1935)
 Molly Flaherty (1937)
 Alicia Walsh (1937)
 Alice Wegemund (1937)
 Mollie Dive (1948)
 Norma Whiteman (1948)
 Thelma McKenzie (1948)
 Florence McClintock (1949)
 Joyce Christ (1949)
 Mary Allitt (1951)
 Kit Raymond (1957)
 Olive Smith (1957)
 Joyce Dalton (1958)
 Marjorie Marvell (1958)
 Muriel Picton (1961)
 Patricia Thomson (1961)
 Hazel Buck (1963)
 Helen Lee (1963)
 Patsy May (1968)
 Margaret Wilson (1969)
 Bev Wilson (1972)
 Tina Macpherson (1972)
 Jackie Potter (1973)
 Wendy Weir (1973)
 Karen Price (1975)
 Jan Lumsden (1976)
 Marie Cornish (1976)
 Julie Stockton (1976)
 Debbie Martin (1979)
 Judith Laing (1979)
 Denise Emerson (1982)
 Lindsay Reeler (1984)
 Trish Dawson (1984)
 Christina Matthews (1984)
 Lyn Larsen (1984)
 Debbie Wilson (1984)
 Denise Annetts (1985)
 Leonie Callaghan (1985)
 Sally Griffiths (1985)
 Belinda Haggett (1986)
 Sally Moffat (1987)
 Cathy Smith (1987)
 Sonia Reamsbottom (1987)
 Bronwyn Calver (1991)
 Belinda Clark (1991)
 Jo Garey (1995)
 Lisa Keightley (1995)
 Olivia Magno (1995)
 Michelle Goszko (1997)
 Martha Winch (1999)
 Terry McGregor (1999)
 Julie Hayes (2000)
 Lisa Sthalekar (2001)
 Emma Liddell (2002)
 Alex Blackwell (2003)
 Leonie Coleman (2004)
 Shannon Cunneen (2004)
 Kate Blackwell (2004)
 Holly Colvin (2005)
 Sarah Andrews (2006)
 Laura Marsh (2006)
 Leah Poulton (2006)
 Ellyse Perry (2007)
 Rene Farrell (2007)
 Erin Osborne (2009)
 Rachael Haynes (2009)
 Alyssa Healy (2010)
 Sarah Coyte (2010)
 Sharon Millanta (2011)
 Naomi Stalenberg (2016)
 Lauren Cheatle (2016)
 Ashleigh Gardner (2017)
 Belinda Vakarewa (2017)
 Sarah Aley (2017)
 Nicola Carey (2018)
 Erin Burns (2019)
 Hannah Darlington (2021)
 Stella Campbell (2021)
 Saskia Horley (2022)
 Phoebe Litchfield (2022)

Coaching staff
 Head coach: Gavan Twining
 Assistant coach: Ben Sawyer
 Head of Female Cricket: Leah Poulton

Honours
Australian Women's Cricket Championships:
Winners (13): 1930–31, 1931–32, 1932–33, 1936–37, 1937–38, 1950–51, 1958–59, 1961–62, 1962–63, 1974–75, 1983–84, 1989–90, 1993–94
Women's National Cricket League:
Winners (20): 1996–97, 1997–98, 1998–99, 1999–2000, 2000–01, 2001–02, 2003–04, 2005–06, 2006–07, 2007–08, 2008–09, 2009–10, 2010–11, 2011–12, 2012–13, 2013–14, 2014–15, 2016–17, 2017–18, 2018–19
Australian Women's Twenty20 Cup:
Winners (2): 2012–13, 2014–15

See also

Cricket in New South Wales
Cricket NSW
New South Wales men's cricket team
Sydney Sixers (WBBL)
Sydney Thunder (WBBL)

References

 
Australian women's cricket teams
Cricket in New South Wales
Br
Sports teams in Sydney